Jeanine De Bique is a Trinidadian classical soprano, trained at the Manhattan School of Music, known for her performance of Baroque music. In the 2017 The Proms she sang Handel's "Rejoice Greatly" with the Chineke! Orchestra, and in 2019 took the part of Iphis in a performance of Handel's Jephtha.

References

External links
 
 

Year of birth missing (living people)
Living people
Trinidad and Tobago opera singers
Operatic sopranos
21st-century Trinidad and Tobago women singers
21st-century Trinidad and Tobago singers